Amakusa Nada is a sea area extending to the west of Shimoshima Island, Amakusa in Japan.

References 

Seas of Japan